Naumann is a Central German variation of the surname Neumann. Notable people with the surname include:

 Albert Naumann (1875–?), German Olympic fencer
 Alexander Naumann (1837–1922), German chemist
 Christian August Naumann (1705–?), German architect
 Cilla Naumann (born 1960), Swedish journalist
 Einar Naumann (1891–1934), Swedish botanist
 Erich Naumann (1905–1951), German Nazi SS-Brigadeführer and Einsatzgruppe commander, executed for war crimes
 Ernst Naumann (1832–1910), German composer
 Francis Naumann, a scholar, curator, and art dealer, specializing in the art of the Dada movement and the Surrealist periods
 Friedrich Naumann (1860–1919), German theologian and politician
 Friedrich Naumann Foundation, German foundation for liberal politics
 Georg Amadeus Carl Friedrich Naumann (1797–1873), German geologist
 Naumann (crater), a lunar impact crater named after him
 Günther Naumann (born 1941), German skier
 Hans Naumann (1886–1951), German literary historian
 Heinrich Edmund Naumann (1854–1927), German geologist
 Horst Naumann (born 1925), German actor
 Johann Andreas Naumann, German farmer and an amateur naturalist
 Johann Christoph von Naumann, German architect
 Johann Friedrich Naumann (1780–1857), German ornithologist
 Johann Gottlieb Naumann (1741–1801), German composer
 Joseph Fred Naumann (born 1949), American prelate of the Roman Catholic Church 
 Kerstin Naumann (born 1981), German rower
 Klaus Naumann (born 1939), German general, who was General Inspector of the German military from 1991 to 1996
 Max Naumann (1875–1939), initiator of the League of National German Jews 
 Michael Naumann (born 1941), German politician, journalist and publicist
 Peter Naumann (born 1941), German sailor
 Robert Naumann (1862–1926), American politician
 Werner Naumann (1909–1982), German politician

Nauman is a variant and may refer to:
 Bruce Nauman (born 1941), contemporary American artist
 Theodor Nauman (1885–1947), Swedish water polo player

See also
Numan (disambiguation)
Nu'man
Naumann (crater), a crater on the Moon

German-language surnames